The 1971 California Angels season involved the Angels finishing 4th in the American League West with a record of 76 wins and 86 losses.

Regular season

Season standings

Record vs. opponents

Opening Day starters 
Sandy Alomar Sr.
Ken Berry
Tony Conigliaro
Jim Fregosi
Alex Johnson
Ken McMullen
Jerry Moses
Jim Spencer
Clyde Wright

Notable transactions 
 April 4, 1971: Joe Henderson was released by the Angels.

Draft picks 
 June 8, 1971: 1971 Major League Baseball Draft
Ron Jackson was drafted by the Angels in the 2nd round.
Billy Smith was drafted by the Angels in the 3rd round.

Roster

Player stats

Batting

Starters by position 
Note: Pos = Position; G = Games played; AB = At bats; H = Hits; Avg. = Batting average; HR = Home runs; RBI = Runs batted in

Other batters 
Note: G = Games played; AB = At bats; H = Hits; Avg. = Batting average; HR = Home runs; RBI = Runs batted in

Pitching

Starting pitchers 
Note: G = Games pitched; IP = Innings pitched; W = Wins; L = Losses; ERA = Earned run average; SO = Strikeouts

Other pitchers 
Note: G = Games pitched; IP = Innings pitched; W = Wins; L = Losses; ERA = Earned run average; SO = Strikeouts

Relief pitchers 
Note: G = Games pitched; W = Wins; L = Losses; SV = Saves; ERA = Earned run average; SO = Strikeouts

Farm system 

LEAGUE CHAMPIONS: Salt Lake City, Quad Cities

Notes

References 
1971 California Angels team page at Baseball Reference
1971 California Angels team page at www.baseball-almanac.com

Los Angeles Angels seasons
California Angels season
Los